Acidocerinae is a subfamily in the family Hydrophilidae of aquatic beetles, and it contains over 500 species in 23 genera.

Taxonomy 
Acidocerinae has been considered a subfamily since Short and Fikáček restructured the classification of the Hydrophilidae in 2013. The entire classification history of the Acidocerinae was revised by Girón and Short in 2021, based on the results of a phylogenetic analysis.

The subfamily currently contains over 500 species in 24 genera, some of which were erected in 2021.

Description 
According to Girón and Short:

Additionally,

Distribution and habitat 
According to Girón and Short:

Genera
 Acidocerus Klug, 1855: 649 
 Agraphydrus Régimbart, 1903: 33 
 Aulonochares Girón & Short, 2019: 112  
 Batochares Hansen, 1991: 292 
 Chasmogenus Sharp, 1882: 73 
 Colossochares Girón & Short, 2021: 55 
 Crephelochares Kuwert, 1890: 38 
 Crucisternum Girón & Short, 2018: 116 
 Ephydrolithus Girón & Short, 2019: 122 
 Globulosis García, 2001: 153 
 Helobata Bergroth, 1888: 137 
 Helochares Mulsant, 1844: 132 
 Helopeltarium d’Orchymont, 1943: 9 
 Katasophistes Girón & Short, 2018: 132 
 Nanosaphes Girón & Short, 2018: 143 
 Novochares Girón & Short, 2021: 87 
 Peltochares Régimbart, 1907: 49 
 Primocerus Girón & Short, 2019: 133 
 Quadriops Hansen, 1999: 131 
 Radicitus Short & García, 2014: 252 
 Sindolus Sharp, 1882: 72 
 Tobochares Short & García, 2007: 2 
 Troglochares Spangler, 1981: 316

References

Hydrophilidae
Polyphaga subfamilies